Fernando Marroquin may refer to:

 Fernando Marroquin (swimmer) (born 1968), Guatemalan swimmer
 Fernando Marroquin (cyclist) (born 1919), Guatemalan cyclist